Alopecurus, or foxtail grass, is a common and widespread genus of plants in the grass family. It is common across temperate and subtropical parts of Eurasia, northern Africa, and the Americas, as well as naturalized in Australia and on various islands.

Foxtails can be annual or perennial. They grow in tufts. They have flat leaves and blunt ligules (a small flap at the junction of leaf and stem). Their inflorescence is a dense panicle (a branching head without terminal flower) with 1-flowered spikelets. A few, particularly A. myosuroides, are considered weeds, others are very decorative and are used in bouquets of dried flowers.

 Species
 Alopecurus aequalis – Orange foxtail, shortawn foxtail – Eurasia, Americas
 Alopecurus albovii – Caucasus
 Alopecurus anatolicus – eastern Turkey
 Alopecurus apiatus – Kyrgyzstan, Tajikistan, Afghanistan, Iraq, Iran
 Alopecurus arundinaceus – Reed foxtail, creeping foxtail, creeping meadow foxtail  – Eurasia, North Africa
 Alopecurus aucheri – Caucasus, Turkey, Iran
 Alopecurus baptarrhenius – Ethiopia
 Alopecurus bonariensis – Argentina, Uruguay
 Alopecurus borii – Turkmenistan
 Alopecurus bornmuelleri – Palestine
 Alopecurus brachystachus – Russia, China, Mongolia
 Alopecurus bulbosus – Bulbous foxtail – Mediterranean, western Europe
 Alopecurus carolinianus – tufted meadow foxtail – US, western Canada
 Alopecurus creticus – Greece, Turkey, Balkans
 Alopecurus dasyanthus – Caucasus, Iran
 Alopecurus davisii – Samos Island in Greece
 Alopecurus geniculatus –  Bent foxtail, marsh meadow foxtail – Algeria, Eurasia
 Alopecurus gerardii – Mediterranean
 Alopecurus glacialis – Caucasus, Turkey, Iran, Afghanistan
 Alopecurus × haussknechtianus – central + northwestern Europe
 Alopecurus heliochloides – Chile
 Alopecurus himalaicus – Himalayas, Pakistan, Afghanistan, Iran, Central Asia, Xinjiang
 Alopecurus hitchcockii – Peru, Bolivia, Jujuy
 Alopecurus japonicus – China, Japan, Korea
 Alopecurus laguroides – Caucasus, Turkey
 Alopecurus lanatus – Turkey
 Alopecurus longiaristatus – Heilongjiang, Primorye, Khabarovsk
 Alopecurus magellanicus – northern Eurasia, North + South America, Falkland Is, South Georgia
 Alopecurus × marssonii – Ukraine
 Alopecurus mucronatus – Iran, Afghanistan, Tajikistan 
 Alopecurus myosuroides – Slender meadow foxtail, black grass, twitch grass, black twitch – Eurasia, North Africa
 Alopecurus nepalensis – Himalayas, Tajikistan, Turkmenistan
 Alopecurus × plettkei – France, Germany, Belgium, Netherlands
 Alopecurus ponticus – Caucasus
 Alopecurus pratensis – meadow foxtail – Eurasia from Azores to Mongolia
 Alopecurus rendlei – central + southern Europe, Algeria, Libya, Turkey
 Alopecurus saccatus – Pacific foxtail – United States (WA OR ID CA), Baja California
 Alopecurus setarioides – France, Greece, Italy, Balkans, Turkey
 Alopecurus textilis – Turkey, Caucasus, Syria, Iraq, Iran, Turkmenistan
 Alopecurus turczaninovii – Siberia
 Alopecurus × turicensis – France, Switzerland
 Alopecurus utriculatus – Greece, Turkey, Iraq, Iran, Cyprus, Syria, Lebanon, Palestine
 Alopecurus vaginatus – Crimea, Caucasus, Turkey, Middle East, Iran, Afghanistan
 Alopecurus × winklerianus – France, Switzerland, Germany, Poland

 formerly included
Numerous species once considered part of Alopecurus but now regarded as better suited to other genera: Agrostis Chaetopogon Cornucopiae Crypsis Koeleria Milium Muhlenbergia Pennisetum Perotis Phleum Polypogon Rostraria Setaria Tribolium

See also
 List of Poaceae genera

References

External links
 Jepson Manual Treatment
 USDA Plants Profile
 Grass Manual Genus Treatment

 
Poaceae genera
Taxa named by Carl Linnaeus